Arenal Airport  is an airport serving La Fortuna, a district in San Carlos Canton, Alajuela Province, Costa Rica. The airport is named after the Arenal Volcano, one of the major tourist attractions in the country.

Arenal Airport is a private-managed airstrip, currently served by daily flights from Quepos and the capital city, San José.

Facilities
The airport has an  asphalt runway commonly served by small aircraft like Cessna 208 Caravan and de Havilland Canada DHC-6 Twin Otter. Approach to Runway 24 crosses over a hangar at the beginning of the runway.

Airlines and destinations

Passenger statistics
These data show number of passengers movements into the airport, according to the Directorate General of Civil Aviation of Costa Rica's Statistical Yearbooks.

See also

Transport in Costa Rica
List of airports in Costa Rica

References

External links
OpenStreetMap - La Fortuna Airport

OurAirports - Arenal Airport
Destination: La Fortuna Nature Air flight information
Destination: La Fortuna Sansa Airlines flight information
Facebook Page of Arenal Airport

Airports in Costa Rica
Buildings and structures in Alajuela Province